The 2004 Japanese Formula 3 Championship was the 25th edition of the Japanese Formula 3 Championship. It began on 28 March at Suzuka and ended on 24 October at Motegi. Italian driver Ronnie Quintarelli took the championship title, winning eight from 20 races.

Teams and drivers
 All teams were Japanese-registered. All cars were powered by Bridgestone tyres.

Race calendar and results

Notes

Standings
Points are awarded as follows:

References

External links
 Official Site 

Formula Three
Japanese Formula 3 Championship seasons
Japan
Japanese Formula 3